The Idaho Military History Museum, located at Gowen Field near Boise, Idaho, features exhibits relating to every branch of the service and each war in which Idahoans have served from the Spanish–American War onwards; the Farragut Naval Training Station (now Farragut State Park, Idaho's largest), Gowen Field itself, the Medal of Honor exhibit, and the well-traveled USS Boise (CL-47) exhibit.

Photo gallery

See also

List of aviation museums

References

External links

 https://museum.mil.idaho.gov

Museums in Boise, Idaho
History museums in Idaho